Møre og Romsdal County Municipality is the democratically elected regional governing administration of Møre og Romsdal county in western Norway. The main responsibilities of the county municipality includes the running of 23 upper secondary schools with 2,000 teachers. It also owns and finances the county's road network, although operation is done through the Norwegian Public Roads Administration. Further responsibilities are public transport, 37 dental clinics with 200 dentists, culture and cultural heritage.

County government
The Møre og Romsdal county council is made up of 47 representatives that are elected every four years. The council essentially acts as a Parliament or legislative body for the county and it meets about six times each year. The council is divided into standing committees and an executive board which meet considerably more often. Both the council and executive board are led by the County Mayor.

County council
The party breakdown of the council is as follows:

References

 
County Municipality
County municipalities of Norway
Public transport administrators of Norway
Public transport in Møre og Romsdal
1838 establishments in Norway
Organisations based in Molde